Streptomyces gelaticus is a bacterium species from the genus of Streptomyces which has been isolated from soil. Streptomyces gelaticus produces maculosin 1, Cyclo(tyrorosylpropyl) and elaiomycin.

See also 
 List of Streptomyces species

References

Further reading

External links
Type strain of Streptomyces gelaticus at BacDive -  the Bacterial Diversity Metadatabase

gelaticus
Bacteria described in 1948